Kreshnik Gjata (born June 23, 1983) is an Albanian former swimmer, who specialized in sprint freestyle events. Gjata qualified for the men's 50 m freestyle at the 2004 Summer Olympics in Athens, by receiving a Universality place from FINA, in an entry time of 26.64. He challenged seven other swimmers in heat three, including 16-year-old Chris Hackel of Mauritius. He posted a lifetime best of 26.61 to earn a fourth spot by a 1.28-second margin behind winner Hackel. Gjata failed to advance into the semifinals, as he shared a sixty-fifth place tie with Kyrgyzstan's Semen Danilov in the prelims.

References

1983 births
Living people
Albanian male freestyle swimmers
Olympic swimmers of Albania
Swimmers at the 2004 Summer Olympics
People from Pogradec
21st-century Albanian people